Sadyba is a neighborhood in Mokotów district of Warsaw, Poland. It has an administrative status of osiedle within the city.  Sadyba can be divided into Old Sadyba, mainly upper class housing, and New-Sadyba with modern retail stores and communist era high rise apartments.  Old and New Sadyba can be divided roughly by Świętego Bonifacego street, just south of the Sadyba Best mall.   Sadyba is known as the "Garden City" due to the large number of household and community gardens tended by the residents.

History 
The Sadyba district was home to the Oasis Battalion (Batalionu Oaza) of the Polish Resistance.

Museums
 Katyń Museum (Muzeum Katynskie) - A museum dedicated to the memory of the Katyn Massacre.
 Polish Army Museum (Muzeum Wojska Polskiego) - A collection of Polish military equipment located at Fort Sadyba.

Famous residents
 Józef Beck - Polish Minister of Foreign Affairs
 Marek Sart - Film composer
 Marek Kondrat - actor
 Jacek Żakowski - journalist
 Dariusz Rosati - Polish Minister of Foreign Affairs
 Leszek Herdegen - poet
 Jerzy Janicki - writer
 Czesław Petelski - film director
 Stanisław Grochowiak - poet
 Jeremi Przybora - poet, writer, actor and singer
 Izydor Modelski - general of Polish Army
 Tadeusz Kasprzycki - general of Polish Army
 Tadeusz Piskor - general of Polish Army

Citations

External links
 

Neighbourhoods of Mokotów